The 1917 Maine Black Bears football team was an American football team that represented the University of Maine during the 1917 college football season. In its first and only season under head coach Thomas A. McCann, the team compiled a 1–3 record. Thomas Davis was the team captain.

Schedule

References

Maine
Maine Black Bears football seasons
Maine Black Bears football